B. portoricensis may refer to:

 Bolbitis portoricensis, a polypod fern
 Borikenophis portoricensis, a snake endemic to Puerto Rico
 Brunfelsia portoricensis, a plant endemic to Puerto Rico
 Buxus portoricensis, an evergreen found in Puerto Rico